The Venturing Leadership Award is presented by councils, areas, regions, and the National Council of the Boy Scouts of America to Venturers and Venturing Advisors who have made exceptional contributions to Venturing and who exemplify the Scout Oath and Scout Law.

The Venturing Leadership Award was briefly unavailable to adult recipients, but has been restored as a recognition for adults as of the 2015 National Annual Meeting of the Boy Scouts of America.

Recipients of the National Venturing Leadership Award

See also
Advancement and recognition in the Boy Scouts of America

References

American awards
Boy Scouts of America